Benjamin Cummings Anderson (born 18 February 1946 in Aberdeen, Scotland), is a Scottish footballer who played as a central defender. He played in the Football League for Blackburn Rovers, Bury and Crystal Palace, and had two spells with Cape Town City in South Africa's National Football League.

References

External links

1946 births
Living people
Scottish footballers
Footballers from Aberdeen
Blackburn Rovers F.C. players
Crystal Palace F.C. players
Bury F.C. players
English Football League players
Association football central defenders
Cape Town City F.C. (NFL) players
Scottish expatriate footballers
Expatriate soccer players in South Africa
Scottish expatriate sportspeople in South Africa
National Football League (South Africa) players